Gustav Closs may refer to:

 Gustav Paul Closs (1840–1870), German landscape painter
 Gustav Adolf Closs (1864–1938), German artist